Ouster, Inc. is an American lidar technology company headquartered in San Francisco, California. It  builds high-resolution, digital 3D lidar sensors for use in autonomous vehicles, industrial, robotics, drones, mapping, defense, and security systems.

Its sensors produce images from ambient infrared, with software that enables a vehicle's sensing and mapping functions.

History 
Angus Pacala and Mark Frichtl founded Ouster in 2015, along with two other former Stanford University classmates, after working at laser-based sensing company Quanergy.

In December 2017 the company launched out of stealth, raising a $27 million series A.

In 2019 Ouster raised an additional $60 million in a round led by Runway Growth Capital, with contributions from Silicon Valley Bank, Cox Enterprises, Constellation Tech Ventures, Fontinalis Partners, and Carthona Capital — bringing the company’s total raised to $90 million.

In March 2021, Ouster completed a merger with Colonnade Acquisition, a special-purpose acquisition company and became publicly traded on the New York Stock Exchange.

In October 2021, Ouster agreed to buy Sense Photonics in an all-stock deal valued around $68 million at the time of the announcement. On completion, Ouster said it would establish Ouster Automotive, a new business arm, which will be headed by Sense CEO Shauna McIntyre.

In November 2022, Ouster and Velodyne Lidar agreed to merge in an all-share transaction in which the combined business will be split evenly between the two companies' existing shareholders. The merger completed in February 2023, with the combined company retaining the Ouster name.

Operations 
Ouster produces three main categories of lidar sensors with varying sizes and range: the OS0, OS1, and OS2. These are manufactured in its production facilities in the United States and Thailand. The company has worked with firms in over 15 different industries across 50 countries.

In 2019, Ouster opened new offices in Paris, Shanghai, and Hong Kong in order to scale its business. The same year Ouster sensors were installed in Postmates’ 'Serve' Autonomous Delivery Rovers operating on sidewalks of Los Angeles, Kodiak’s trucks operating in Texas adopted its sensors for testing. For the 2019 DARPA SubT challenge coal mines of Pennsylvania, its lidar sensors were mounted on drones. Ouster lidar sensors are used to provide vehicles with the ability to sense, classify, and understand its immediate environment.

Ouster was selected by autonomous trucking startup Ike as Lidar supplier to bring its automated trucking to market. It is also working with Coast Autonomous to produce self-driving passenger shuttles and autonomous utility vehicles. Ouster has also been working with NVIDIA and Volvo Trucks to develop self-driving systems for commercial use.

In 2020 Ouster partnered with Chinese robotics company iDriverplus to provide lidar sensors for autonomous cleaning robots. During the COVID-19 state of emergency, the two companies partnered to outfit a fleet of robots with OS1-64 lidar sensors. The unmanned cleaning and disinfection vehicles were equipped with lidar sensors on the top and front of the robots providing 360° 3D environmental monitoring and obstacle recognition.

Models

Awards and recognition 
In 2020, Ouster was an Honoree at the CES Innovation Awards for the OS2-128 LiDAR sensor within the Vehicle Intelligence & Transportation category.

References 

Lidar
Self-driving car companies
American companies established in 2015
Transport companies established in 2015
Companies based in San Francisco
Transportation companies based in California
2015 establishments in California
Special-purpose acquisition companies